Candalides helenita, the shining pencil-blue, is a species of butterfly of the family Lycaenidae. It is found in Australia and Indonesia.

The wingspan is about 30 mm. Adults males are blue with a narrow black margin around each wing. The females are dark brown with a white patch on each wing. The underside of both sexes is white with a few dark dots around the hindwing margins.

The larvae have been recorded feeding on the young foliage of Arytera pauciflora, Glochidion ferdinandi, Cryptocarya hypospodia and Brachychiton acerifolium. They are green to brown with a pale brown head. Pupation takes place in a brown pupa which is formed in a curled leaf at the bottom of the host plant.

Subspecies
Candalides helenita helenita (Cape York to Cairns)
Candalides helenita dimorpha (Röber, 1886) (Waigeu, Misool, Jobi, West Irian to Papua)

References

Candalidini
Butterflies described in 1879
Butterflies of Australia
Butterflies of Indonesia
Taxa named by Georg Semper